La Coronela was the name of the armed force of the town of Barcelona, and its objective was to defend the city during the War of the Spanish Succession. It was formed, in great part, by craftsmen and organized under the commandment of the Conseller en cap (Head councillor, in Catalan) of the Consell de Cent of Barcelona.

It played a crucial role in the defense of the city against the Bourbonic troops (also called Philippists or Botiflers) from 1710 to 1714, specially since the Archduke Charles went to Vienna in 1713, abandoning his supporters to their own luck.

Military organization
Some sources point that about 4,000 soldiers of La Coronela defended the city during the Siege of Barcelona. They were organized in 6 battalions with a total of 48 companies, and each company contained between 80 and 90 armsmen.

See also
 War of the Spanish Succession
 Siege of Barcelona (1713–1714)
 Barcelona
 Rafael Casanova
 Antonio de Villarroel i Peláez
 General Moragues
 Francesc de Castellví i Obando

External links
Personal website of Jordi Torrades. It talks about the War of the Spanish Succession
 La Coronela of the town of Barcelona
 The Battle of the 11 of September 1714

Coronela
History of Barcelona
Infantry units and formations
Military units and formations of the Early Modern period